Galinhada is a stew of rice with chicken, which is a typical Brazilian dish in the states of Goiás and Minas Gerais.

The name comes from galinha, Portuguese for "chicken", and is pronounced .

See also
 Chicken and rice (disambiguation)
 Feijoada
 List of Brazilian dishes
 List of chicken dishes
 List of stews

References

Brazilian stews
Portuguese stews
Chicken and rice dishes